Kim Seong-hyeon (born 17 September 1998) is a South Korean professional golfer who plays on the PGA Tour. He has also played on the Japan Golf Tour and the Korean Tour. He won the 2020 KPGA Championship on the Korean Tour and the 2021 Japan PGA Championship on the Japan Golf Tour.

Professional career
Kim turned professional in late 2017. In late 2018, he finished 4th in the Japan Golf Tour Qualifying School to gain a place on the tour for 2019. In 2019, he played on the main Japanese tour but also played a number of events on the second-tier Japan Challenge Tour, winning the Heiwa PGM Challenge I Road To Championship in May. Kim was a surprise winner of the 2020 KPGA Championship. At the time, he wasn't a full Korean Tour member and only played after playing in a Monday qualifying event in which he finished in the final qualifying place. He made a birdie at the 17th hole and had a final round of 67 to win by one stroke. His win gave him a place on the Korean Tour for the following five years and entry into the CJ Cup on the 2020–21 PGA Tour.

In May 2021, Kim had a final round of 58 in the Golf Partner Pro-Am Tournament, finishing in a tie for 11th place. In July, he won the Japan PGA Championship by a stroke from Yuta Ikeda and Yuki Inamori, his first win on the Japan Golf Tour.

Kim played primarily on the Korn Ferry Tour in 2022 and earned his PGA Tour card for the 2022–23 season through the Korn Ferry Tour Finals. He was voted 2022 Korn Ferry Tour Rookie of the year.

Professional wins (3)

Japan Golf Tour wins (1)

Korean Tour wins (1)

Japan Challenge Tour wins (1)

Playoff record
Korn Ferry Tour playoff record (0–1)

Results in The Players Championship

CUT = missed the halfway cut

See also
2022 Korn Ferry Tour Finals graduates
Lowest rounds of golf

References

External links

South Korean male golfers
Japan Golf Tour golfers
PGA Tour golfers
Korn Ferry Tour graduates
1998 births
Living people